Lillias Robertson (20 July 1882 – 13 March 1976) was a British archer.  She competed at the 1908 Summer Olympics in London. Robertson competed at the 1908 Games in the only archery event open to women, the double National round.  She took 13th place in the event with 500 points.

References

External links
 
 
 

1882 births
1976 deaths
Archers at the 1908 Summer Olympics
Olympic archers of Great Britain
British female archers